Leionema lachnaeoides, is a tall shrub with aromatic leaves and yellow flowers from winter to late spring. It is restricted to the Blue Mountains in New South Wales.

Description
The leaf upper and lower side and edges are smooth, surface leathery, margins rolled under almost obscuring the paler underside. The 5 prominent, yellow stamens only slightly longer than the petals. Flowering occurs between winter and late spring.

Taxonomy and naming
This species was described in 1825 by Allan Cunningham, but the name was changed to Leionema lachnaeoides in 1998 by Paul G. Wilson and the description was published in the journal Nuytsia. The specific epithet (lachnaeoides) is from the Greek lachne- meaning "soft wool" and -oides meaning "resembling" a reference to the hairiness of the species.

Distribution and habitat
Leionema lachnaeoides grows on rocky outcrops, among heath and scrubland west of Katoomba in the Blue Mountain and from Shipley Plateau, Blackheath.

Conservation status
This species is classified as "endangered" under the Environment Protection and Biodiversity Conservation Act 1999 due to factors including weed invasion, altered drainage and fire regimes.

References

lachnaeoides
Sapindales of Australia
Flora of New South Wales
Taxa named by Paul G. Wilson